The 100th District of the Iowa House of Representatives in the state of Iowa.

Current elected officials
Charles Isenhart is the representative currently representing the district.

Past representatives
The district has previously been represented by:
 John Clark, 1971–1973
 George J. Knoke, 1973–1975
 Craig D. Walter, 1975–1981
 Marcia Walter, 1981–1983
 Emil S. Pavich, 1983–1993
 Dennis Cohoon, 1993–2003
 Brad Hansen, 2003–2003
 Paul Shomshor, 2003–2011
 Mark Brandenburg, 2011–2013
 Charles Isenhart, 2013–present

References

100